Dexing may refer to:

Recreational use of dextromethorphan
Dexing, Tibet, village in the Tibet Autonomous Region of China
Dexing, Jiangxi, city in Jiangxi, China